Peter Gabrielsson (born July 31, 1960 in Rosersberg) is a Swedish sport shooter. He competed in rifle shooting events at the Summer Olympics in 1992 and 1996.

Olympic results

References

1960 births
Living people
ISSF rifle shooters
Swedish male sport shooters
Shooters at the 1992 Summer Olympics
Shooters at the 1996 Summer Olympics
Olympic shooters of Sweden